On the Level is the eighth studio album by English rock band Status Quo. It features Francis Rossi, Richard Parfitt, Alan Lancaster and John Coghlan. The album's cover art features band members in an Ames room, and on the original vinyl release, the inner gatefold sleeve consisted of informal photos members of the group had taken of each other.

In November 1974 the band released the only single from the album, an edited version of a Rossi/Young song entitled "Down Down". The single gave the band their only number-one hit to date. Its b-side was the Parfitt/Young album track "Nightride".

When the album was released in February 1975, the group were more or less at the peak of their career, record sales-wise. The album entered the chart at #1.  All tracks were written or co-written by the group and long-term collaborator Bob Young, apart from "Bye Bye Johnny", which was a Chuck Berry composition.

Track listing

2005 reissue bonus tracks
 "Down Down" [single version] (Rossi, Young) – 3:50
 "Roll Over Lay Down" [live] (Rossi, Parfitt, Lancaster, Coghlan, Young) – 5:41
 "Gerdundula" [live] (Manston, James) – 2:35
 "Junior's Wailing" [live] (White, Pugh) – 3:57
 "Roadhouse Blues" [live] (Jim Morrison, John Densmore, Robby Krieger, Ray Manzarek) – 12:24

Personnel
Status Quo
 Francis Rossi – guitar, vocals
 Rick Parfitt – guitar, keyboards, vocals
 Alan Lancaster – bass, guitar, vocals
 John Coghlan – drums

Charts

Weekly charts

Year-end charts

Certifications

References

1975 albums
Capitol Records albums
Status Quo (band) albums
Vertigo Records albums
Albums recorded at IBC Studios